John Landles Purse (28 June 1879 – 2 March 1953) was an Australian rules footballer who played for the St Kilda Football Club and Melbourne Football Club in the Victorian Football League (VFL).

Family
The son of John Purse (1838–1893), and Alison Purse (1845–1927), née Landles, John Landles Purse was born in Hawthorn, Victoria on 28 June 1879.

He married Victoria May McKay (1878–1972) on 25 April 1904. One of their sons, Neil Landles Purse (1911–1942), was killed in action serving with the Second AIF on 26 October 1942.

Football
Recruited from Brighton in the Metropolitan Junior Football Association, Purse made his VFL debut for St Kilda against  in round 17 of the 1898 VFL season, at Corio Oval. He transferred to Melbourne in 1900 and in his first season became a premiership player, playing in the 1900 VFL Grand Final at centre half-back. He has been given the Melbourne Heritage Number of 77, based on the order of his debut for the club. 

His younger brother Hugh Purse also played for Melbourne.

Death
He died at his home in Boyup Brook, Western Australia on 2 March 1953.

References

External links

 
 
 Jack Purse, demonwiki.org.
 Jack Purse: Boyles Football Photos.

1879 births
1953 deaths
St Kilda Football Club players
Melbourne Football Club players
Brighton Football Club players
Australian rules footballers from Melbourne
Melbourne Football Club Premiership players
One-time VFL/AFL Premiership players
People from Hawthorn, Victoria